Vijay Kumar Sinha is an Indian politician and leader of the opposition in the Bihar Legislative Assembly.  He is a member of the Bharatiya Janata Party and a member of Bihar Legislative Assembly from Lakhisarai constituency since 2010.

He was the Speaker of the Bihar Legislative Assembly from 25 Nov 2020 to 24 August 2022, Vijay Sinha resigned from his post following a no-confidence motion moved against him by the current ruling Mahagathbandhan.

References 

1967 births
Living people
Speakers of the Bihar Legislative Assembly
Bharatiya Janata Party politicians from Bihar
Bihar MLAs 2010–2015
Bihar MLAs 2015–2020
Bihar MLAs 2020–2025